Fabian Marco Johnson (born December 11, 1987) is a professional soccer player who plays as a full-back and wide midfielder. Born in Germany, he represented the United States national team, having also represented Germany in youth competitions.

Early life 
Johnson was born in Munich, Germany. He is the son of an African-American serviceman and former basketball player who played in Germany, and a German-American mother. In 1991, he started playing soccer at the Sportfreunde München.

Club career 
In mid-1996, Johnson moved to the renowned youth ranks of 1860 Munich. Johnson was promoted to the first team of 1860 München in July 2006. He amassed 89 league appearances scoring four goals before transferring to VfL Wolfsburg on July 14, 2009. He scored his first goal for VfL Wolfsburg in a 2–2 draw at home to SC Freiburg. In July 2011, Johnson transferred to 1899 Hoffenheim.

On September 26, 2012, Johnson scored in Hoffenheim's 3–0 victory over VfB Stuttgart, their first win of the new campaign.

On February 24, 2014, it was confirmed that Johnson would join Borussia Mönchengladbach on a free transfer following the conclusion of the 2013–14 season.

On August 23, 2014, Johnson made his first league appearance for Borussia Mönchengladbach, coming on in the 72nd minute of the home match against VfB Stuttgart. On 13 September 2014, he made his first league start in a home 4–1 win over FC Schalke 04. He scored his first UEFA Champions League goal on November 3, 2015, against Juventus. He scored his first Bundesliga goal for Borussia Mönchengladbach on March 1, 2015, against SC Paderborn.

On September 26, 2012, Johnson scored in Hoffenheim's 3–0 victory over VfB Stuttgart, their first win of the new campaign.

On February 24, 2014, it was confirmed that Johnson would join Borussia Mönchengladbach on a free transfer following the conclusion of the 2013–14 season.

On August 24, 2014, Johnson made his first league appearance for Borussia Mönchengladbach, coming on in the 72nd minute of the home match against VfB Stuttgart. On September 13, 2014, he made his first league start in a home 4–1 win over FC Schalke 04. He scored his first UEFA Champions League goal on November 3, 2015, against Juventus. He scored his first Bundesliga goal for Borussia Mönchengladbach on March 1, 2015, against SC Paderborn.

International career
On August 25, 2011, Johnson was called up to the United States national team by head coach Jürgen Klinsmann for friendly matches with Costa Rica (September 2) and Belgium (September 6). Johnson had represented Germany at youth level, but was eligible for a one-time switch to represent the United States at senior level due to new FIFA eligibility rules; however, he wound up not being able to play as the required paperwork was still pending.

On November 11, 2011, Johnson made his international debut for the U.S. as a substitute in a 1–0 loss to France. On November 15, 2011, Johnson made his first full international start against Slovenia and drew a penalty in a 3–2 win. He played in the FIFA World Cup qualifier on June 12, 2012, against Guatemala. Johnson earned his first mark for the USMNT notching the assist in the United States' only goal in their 4–1 loss to Brazil on June 23, 2012. He scored his first national team goal on June 1, 2014, in a pre World Cup friendly against Turkey. Johnson started each of the United States national team's three group stage matches in the 2014 FIFA World Cup as well as the Round of 16 matchup with Belgium. He secured his second national team goal on November 13, 2015, in a World Cup qualifying match against Saint Vincent and the Grenadines.

On March 12, 2019, Johnson spoke with United States national team head coach Gregg Berhalter about the possibility of returning to the national team. Johnson has not played for the United States national team since he started in a World Cup qualifying loss to Costa Rica in September 2017.

Career statistics

Club

International 

Scores and results list United States' goal tally first, score column indicates score after each Johnson goal.

Honors

International 
Germany U21
 UEFA European Under-21 Championship: 2009

References

External links 

 
 

1987 births
Living people
American people of German descent
German people of African-American descent
Sportspeople of American descent
Citizens of the United States through descent
Footballers from Munich
German footballers
American soccer players
African-American soccer players
Association football defenders
Association football midfielders
Association football utility players
TSV 1860 Munich II players
TSV 1860 Munich players
VfL Wolfsburg players
TSG 1899 Hoffenheim players
Borussia Mönchengladbach players
2. Bundesliga players
Bundesliga players
Germany youth international footballers
Germany under-21 international footballers
United States men's international soccer players
2014 FIFA World Cup players
2015 CONCACAF Gold Cup players
Copa América Centenario players
21st-century African-American sportspeople
20th-century African-American people